Anoncia psepsa is a moth in the family Cosmopterigidae. It was described by Ronald W. Hodges in 1978. It is found in North America, where it has been recorded from Arizona.

References

Moths described in 1978
Cosmopteriginae
Moths of North America